Run is a 2004 Indian Hindi language action film. It stars Abhishek Bachchan and Bhumika Chawla. It is directed by Jeeva and was a remake of a 2002 Tamil film of the same name, starring Madhavan and Meera Jasmine. The film was produced by Boney Kapoor and Sridevi. The film received mixed reviews and was a failure at the box office. The director of the film worked as the cinematographer for the original.

Plot 
Siddharth alias "Sidhu" (Abhishek Bachchan) comes to New Delhi for his further studies and stays with his sister Esha (Ayesha Jhulka) from Allahabad. His spoiled friend Ganesh (Vijay Raaz) trails behind him and arrives later. Sidhu, through perceived destiny and chance, bumps into Janhvi (Bhumika Chawla). Sidhu falls in love with Janhvi, who belongs to a conservative Haryanvi family. Janhvi's elder brother, Ganpat (Mahesh Manjrekar), is a head of the family who is very protective of his family, mainly his sister, after the loss of their parents.

Initially, Janhvi brushes off Sidhu's constant attempts to be with her in order to keep him safe from Ganpat. An encounter with the thugs and Sidhu leads Janhvi to encourage Sidhu to run, but he instead rises to the challenge and fights off all the thugs. While Ganpat goes to threaten Esha and her husband, Sidhu threatens him back viciously as he was one step ahead of him and planned to retaliate (though falsely) by killing Ganpat's family, excluding Janhvi.

Sidhu and Janhvi keep meeting with each other, hiding and running from Janhvi's brother and his men, while Sidhu fights off any thugs that follow him and threaten to hurt him or his family. Eventually, Ganpat decides to use his thugs to beat up a boy who was giving Sidhu a hard time in school, thus giving the impression to the principal of the school that Sidhu is a thug. Sidhu is suspended in return. Then, they hit Esha with a van and frame her husband for him to lose his job all at the same time, while Sidhu and Janhvi agree they should elope and be married before she is married off.

Meanwhile, Ganesh is constantly tricked and goes through various harsh realities about life. In the end, Ganesh loses all his money, his watch, his clothes, his hope to meet his friend Sidhu and a kidney. All his experiences end in the form of making Ganesh accidentally a "Pettycoat Baba", a saint who is believed by the people (not by Ganesh) to be living in the Himalayas for 250 years.

In the climax, Sidhu hatches a plan to bait Ganpat and his men to the wrong area and marry Janhvi with her remaining family members who care for her and Sidhu, until Ganpat gets wind of this and tracks them down. The newlyweds now have to run from a mass of thugs. This leads to a final battle which ends with a one-on-one fight with Sidhu and Ganpat. Sidhu wins and refuses to deal with the death blow, allowing him to live. Ganpat allows Janhvi and Sidhu to leave, finally accepting him as his brother in-law. Sidhu and Janhvi leave, married.

Cast

Soundtrack

Music by Himesh Reshammiya. Lyrics by Sameer.

References

External links
 

2004 films
2000s Hindi-language films
Films set in Delhi
Indian action comedy films
Indian romantic action films
Films directed by Jeeva
Films scored by Himesh Reshammiya
2000s masala films
Hindi remakes of Tamil films
2004 action comedy films
2000s romantic action films